Ahmed Januzi (born 8 July 1988) is an Albanian professional footballer who plays as a striker for Kosovar club Prishtina. He previously represented Albania national team, collecting 8 appearances.

Club career

Early career
Ahmed Januzi was born in Vučitrn to Kosovar Albanian parents. Growing up in Vučitrn, Januzi joined the city club, KF Kosova Vushtrri. At the age of nineteen, Januzi joined Albanian Superliga club, Besa Kavajë as a senior.

Besa Kavajë
Januzi only played for half a season in Albania. He made thirty appearances and scored seven times. During the winter break, Januzi transferred to Vorskla Poltava in February 2007.

Vorskla Poltava
Januzi made his debut on 7 March 2007, against FC Shakhtar Donetsk at the Donbass Arena. He came off the bench on the 59th minute and scored on the 90th minute. In that season, Januzi made nine league matches, starting in only two of the matches. Vorskla finished thirteen that season.

In the 2007–08 season, Januzi made twenty three league appearances, starting in only two matches. He scored his second goal for Vorskla against Karpaty Lviv away that season and produced three assists. Vorskla finished eighth that season.

In the 2008–09 season, Januzi played a more influential role in the squad. He started in six matches and appeared in twenty. Januzi scored the first goal of the tournament on 18 July 2008 in the 72nd minute of an away match against FC Kharkiv and also scored against Metalurg Donetsk that season. Januzi also produced three assists. Januzi helped Vorskla reach the finals of the Ukrainian Cup, which Vorskla won 1:0 against Shakhtar Donetsk. He helped Vorskla reach fifth in the table, which secured them a spot in the Play-off round in the UEFA Europa League for the 2009–10 season.

In the 2009–10 season, Januzi started in eight matches and appeared in twenty four matches. He scored twice that season against Metalurg Donetsk both home and away. Januzi also made two assists.

In the 2010–11 season, Januzi was more a regular starter for Vorskla. He started in thirteen matches and appeared in twenty one matches. He scored eight goals and two assists that season. Januzi was an important member of the team since towards the end of the season, Vorskla and Tavriya Simferopol were both equal in the sixth and seventh spot on the table. Januzi scored against Shakhtar Donetsk and against 	
Karpaty Lviv in the final two games, which resulted in both teams having equal points but Vorskla being sixth due to goal difference. They secured a Second qualifying round spot in the UEFA Europa League.

In the 2011–12 season, Januzi has so far started in eleven matched and appeared in eighteen. He has currently scored five goals and has assisted one.

Januzi has helped Vorskla reach the final qualification round of the UEFA Europa League by score trice against Glentoran F.C home and away. In the final qualification round, Januzi scored against FC Dinamo București, resulting in Vorskla reaching the group stage of the UEFA Europa League for the first time in the group stage, Januzi did not score but managed an assist against Hannover 96.

Prishtina

On 14 June 2016, Januzi returned in Kosovo by completing a transfer to Prishtina, signing a one-year contract, taking the vacant squad number 27. He was presented on the same day along with players such as Armend Dallku and Debatik Curri, his former international teammates. During the 2016–17 season, he made 18 league appearances and scored 2 goals as Prishtina finished runner-up in the championship, securing a spot Europa League first qualifying round.

International career

Under-21
Januzi was part of Albania under-21 squad in the qualifiers of 2011 UEFA European Under-21 Championship. He was the main striker, collecting six matches and scoring one goal. He made his under-21 debut on 28 March 2008 in the first match against Scotland which finished in a 0–1 home defeat. His first under-21 goal came in his fifth appearance for the team in the 4–2 away loss to Belarus. Albania finished Group A in fourth place tied on points with Azerbaijan.

Senior
Januzi made his senior international debut on 17 November 2010 during the goalless home draw against Macedonia by appearing as a substitute in the second half. A year later, Januzi received his second call up by coach Josip Kuže for the last UEFA Euro 2012 qualifying matches against France and Romania on 7 and 11 October 2011 respectively. He played in both matches as substitute and collected 60 minutes, making his competitive debut in the process.

References

External links

 
 
 

1988 births
Living people
Sportspeople from Vushtrri
Kosovo Albanians
Association football forwards
Kosovan footballers
Albanian footballers
Albania international footballers
Besa Kavajë players
FC Vorskla Poltava players
FC Prishtina players
KF Llapi players
Kategoria Superiore players
Ukrainian Premier League players
Football Superleague of Kosovo players
Albanian expatriate footballers
Expatriate footballers in Ukraine
Albanian expatriate sportspeople in Ukraine